The Rumbalara Football Netball Club  (Rumbalara FNC), nicknamed Rumba, is an Aboriginal Australian sporting club located in Shepparton, Victoria. The club's teams play Australian Rules Football (in the Murray Football League) since 2006.

History
The club has its roots in the Cummeragunja Reserve, whose last residents were moved to Rumbalara in 1956.

The Rumbalara Football Club debuted in 1997 in second division of the Goulburn Valley Football League and finished fourth. The following year it won the Second division pennant, defeating Alexandra.

In 1999 Rumbalara and all the second division clubs seceded from the Goulburn Valley FL and formed the Central Goulburn Football League. It won the first premiership of the league and also won in 2002. It was runner-up in 2004 and 2005. It lost the 2004 Grand final replay by six points.

When the Central Goulburn FL finished in 2005 the club was unsuccessful in applying for admittance into the Goulburn Valley Football League. It was admitted to the Murray Football League in 2006.

In 2014 Rumbalara defeated Finley Football Club by 5 points in an epic Murray Football League grand final at Moama Recreation Reserve to win their first premiership in the league.  30 points down at half time, Rumba powered home in the second half, with former Collingwood and West Coast Eagles player Brad Dick kicking the goal to put Rumba in front with just two minutes remaining.

Premierships
Murray Football League
2014
Central Goulburn Football League
1999, 2002
Goulburn Valley Football League Division 2
1998

AFL Players
Chris Egan - Collingwood
Jarrod Atkinson - Essendon

References

External links

Murray Football League clubs
1997 establishments in Australia
Australian rules football clubs in Victoria (Australia)